The Phra Bang ("Royal Buddha Image in the Dispelling Fear mudra"), Lao (ພະ + ບາງ) is the palladium of Laos. The Lao-language name for the image has been transliterated in a number of ways, including "Pra Bang," "Prabang," "Phabang" and "Pha Bang." The statue is an 83 cm-high standing Buddha with palms facing forward, cast using thong, an alloy of bronze, gold, and silver. According to local lore, it was cast in Ceylon (now Sri Lanka) sometime between the 1st and 9th century. However, the features of the image suggest a much later Khmer origin.

The Phra Bang arrived in Lan Xang during the reign of Fa Ngum from Angkor, and was used to spread Theravada Buddhism in the new kingdom. In 1359 the Khmer king gave the Phra Bang to his son-in-law, the first Lang Xang monarch Fa Ngum (1353-1373); to provide Buddhist legitimacy both to Fa Ngum's rule and by extension to the sovereignty of Laos. The former Lao capital Luang Prabang, where it was kept, is named after the Buddha image.

The Phra Bang has long been seen by devout Buddhists as a symbol of the right to rule Laos, as only a commendable and virtuous government deserves to be caretaker of such a sacred image. In 1705, the Phra Bang was taken to Vientiane. In 1778, the Siamese (now Thai) invaded Vientiane and captured the Phra Bang, taking it back to Bangkok. There, political upheaval and misfortune were attributed to the Phra Bang, and in 1782 it was returned to the Lao people. Again in 1828, the Siamese captured the Phra Bang but again returned it in 1867 after a similar period of political upheaval.

In 2013 the Prabang Buddha was moved from the National Museum and brought to Haw Pha Ban on the Royal Palace grounds. Each year, on the third day of "Pimai" or Lao New Year, the Phra Bang is taken in procession to Wat Mai. There it is exhibited at a shrine where the Buddha image is ritually bathed by devout laypeople during Lao New Year festivities.

See also
 Cetiya
 Emerald Buddha
 Mahamuni Buddha
 Phra Sukhothai Traimit

References

Tai history
Buddhism in Laos
Buildings and structures in Luang Prabang
1350s in Lan Xang
Buddha statues